M/V Kefallinia was a Greek ro-ro ferry. It was the first passenger ferry for Strintzis Lines (Now Blue Star Ferries). It was built in 1965 at the Th. Zervas & Sons shipyard in Perama, Greece. It could hold up a total of 600 passengers and 70 vehicles. It had Two 8-cyl, Werkspoor diesel engines with combined power of 2942 kW and could reach speeds up to 15 knots.

History 
The ship operated for Strintzis Lines  mainly between the city of Patras and the Ionian island of Cephalonia. She also operated on other Greek islands. In 1993 she was sold to the Katapoliani company, and renamed Express Paros remaining in service in Greek waters, sailing between Syros, Paros, Naxos, Ios and Santorini, and occasionally other smaller islands.

In 1999, when she reached the permitted age limit, the ship was sold to the Tanzanian company Victoria Marine Passenger Transport Ltd., renamed Zahara, and served between Dar es Salaam and Mtwara. After a breakdown at sea in 2001 the ship was barred from sailing in Tanzanian coastal waters, and was abandoned in Dar es Salaam. The Tanzanian Ports Authority announced in 2005 that it would scrap the derelict vessel unless the owners removed it. She was finally scrapped in November 2005.

Route 
The ship was used on the following routes:

References

External links
 
 

1965 ships
Ships built in Greece
Ferries of Greece
Ferries of Tanzania